Brigadier General LeGrande Albert "Pick" Diller (16 February 1901 – 2 September 1987) was a United States Army officer during World War II. He served as General of the Army Douglas MacArthur's Aide-de-camp in the South West Pacific Area during the war.

Early life
Born in Tonawanda, Erie County, New York, he had two brothers Everell (who retired as an army colonel), Thurlow Diller and two sisters.

Military career
Diller was commissioned as a 2nd Lieutenant of Infantry in the Regular Army on February 19, 1923, and he graduated Syracuse University in 1924 with a Bachelor of Science degree in chemical engineering. He was promoted to 1st lieutenant in 1927 and graduated from the Infantry School Company Officers Course in 1928. He was promoted to captain in August 1935 and graduated from the Command and General Staff School in 1937. Transferred to Philippines in 1939, he was promoted on July 1, 1940, to major.

In 1941, he became one of General Douglas MacArthur's personal Aides and on December 19, 1941, he received a promotion to the temporary rank of lieutenant colonel in the Army of the United States. He would handle MacArthur's public relations and maintain his public image. He would flee with MacArthur from the Philippines in four PT boats with MacArthur in PT-41 and Diller in PT-35. In March 1942, he was promoted to colonel and was transferred to the General Staff Corps on October 17, 1942. He remained with MacArthur during the war, receiving a promotion to brigadier general on January 9, 1945. He was the lead US Army representative on the committee that arranged the formal Japanese surrender aboard the battleship  in Tokyo Harbor on September 2, 1945.

Following the war, Diller worked under MacArthur serving as Secretary of the Army general staff in Tokyo. Thereafter from 1947 to 1954, reverting to the Regular Army rank of colonel, Diller commanded infantry regiments in West Germany including 22nd Infantry Regiment. He retired from the army in 1954 with the rank of brigadier general.

Later life
Following his retirement he served in the board of directors of Ringling School of Art. He died of cancer in Georgia in 1987.

Family
He was married  Harriett "Hat", who died in 1986, after which he married his second wife, Mary, in July 1987. He had one son, Richard W. Diller, who retired from the Army as a colonel.

In popular culture
Diller was portrayed by actor Allan Miller in the 1977 film MacArthur.

References

External links
Generals of World War II

1901 births
1987 deaths
United States Army Infantry Branch personnel
People from Erie County, New York
Syracuse University alumni
United States Army Command and General Staff College alumni
Recipients of the Distinguished Service Medal (US Army)
Recipients of the Silver Star
United States Army generals
United States Army generals of World War II